Koubbeh Palace, (Arabic ) is one of the various Egyptian palaces which serve as the country's official guest house for visiting dignitaries.

The palace was most likely originally built in the mid-19th century and sold to Khedive Ismail in 1866 by his brother Mustafa Fazl Pasha. It is situated several kilometers north of downtown Cairo, Koubbeh Palace was originally surrounded by agricultural fields and rural villages.

Under the Monarchy 
Under Khedive Tewfik, Koubbeh Palace was a venue for One Thousand And One Night celebrations, royal weddings, and a place where visiting dignitaries admired magnificent gardens. During his son's rule (Khedive Abbas Hilmi II; r. 1892-1914) the garden palace gradually came to be regarded as complementary to Cairo's Abdin Palace in terms of officialdom. 

When King Fouad I ascended Egypt's throne in 1917, Koubbeh became the official royal residence.
In addition, a royal train station was added to the palace complex where visiting dignitaries arrived by special carriage directly from Alexandria or from Cairo's main railway station. 

It was at this palace that King Fouad died, and his then 16-year-old son King Farouk greeted his subjects during an inaugural radio broadcast on 8 May 1936. King Farouk kept his personal collections at Koubbeh. These included a stamp collection, an 8,500-piece coin and medals collection, studded clocks and watches, in addition to many other antiquities including a pure gold coffee set and a 1906 Faberge egg that belonged to the last Russian Tsar. Much of these were auctioned off in 1954.

The Republic 
After the 1952 revolution that led to the declaration of the republic, Koubbeh Palace was declared as one of three official presidential palaces, the other two being Abdeen Palace in downtown Cairo and Ras Al-Teen Palace in Alexandria. It was at Koubbeh that Gamal Abdel Nasser preferred to host guests. It was also there that his body lay awaiting his funeral in September 1970. The Shah of Iran also lived in this palace when in exile in Egypt. Koubbeh remains Egypt's principal guesthouse. U.S. President Barack Obama was received in it during his visit to Cairo in June 2009.

References

Presidential palaces in Egypt
Palaces in Cairo
Royal residences in Egypt
Tourist attractions in Cairo
State guesthouses